Parliamentary elections were held in Greece on . The Liberal Party won 146 of the 181 seats. Eleftherios Venizelos remained Prime Minister, having assumed office on 18 October 1910.

Results

References

Greece
Parliamentary elections in Greece
1912 in Greece
1910s in Greek politics
Eleftherios Venizelos
History of Greece (1909–1924)
Greece
Legl